A streetfighter, muscle bike, or super naked is a motorcycle of high displacement and horsepower. It is typically a super bike with the fairings and windscreen removed. Beyond simply removing fairings, specific changes that exemplify the streetfighter look are a pair of large, round headlights, tall, upright handlebars such as those on a motocross bike, and short, loud, lightweight mufflers, and changes in the sprockets to increase torque and acceleration at lower speeds. Streetfighters is also the name of a UK motorcycle magazine.

Later streetfighters used custom-built frames intended to overcome the weakness of the tubular steel frames of the early 4-cylinder superbikes of the 1970s and 1980s. Many of these frames turned out to be "beautifully crafted pieces of metallurgical art," perhaps only unintentionally. Many were also originally racing machines.

Made popular by European riders, this type of custom motorcycle gained worldwide popularity, and motorcycle manufacturers responded in the late 1990s by adopting the terminology and producing factory-built streetfighters, beginning with the 1994 Triumph Speed Triple and the 1999 Honda X11, up through the 2009 Ducati Streetfighter.

History 

Though it has its styling roots in the café racer culture of the 1950s and 1960s, the streetfighter is very much inspired by the new Japanese bikes of the late 1970s and early 1980s, possibly from young riders who couldn't afford to replace damaged fairings after repeated crashes. Later, more appropriate headlights were added, then high handlebars to aid in wheelies and other stunts.

The first sighting of the streetfighter design template was seen in Bike magazine in 1983 when the editor commissioned Andy Sparrow to draw a comic strip to replace Ogri. It was titled Bloodrunners and featured dispatch riders, delivering blood and live human organs for transplant operations in which bikers rode enormous Japanese inline fours with turbos, with no extraneous parts. Fairings, mirrors, pillion seats & rear footpegs etc. were all binned (removed) in favour of lightness and handling ability. Under-seat exhausts, dual headlights and the widest sport tyres were de-rigueur.

Actor Huggy Leaver is credited with being inspired to build such customized motorcycles in this style and there was a proliferation of 'ratted' streetfighters in London around the late 1980s. The term streetfighter was first applied to a custom street bike by a British photojournalist and bike builder to a Harley-Davidson customized sports-bike, and later extended to the Japanese four-cylinder customs being created at the time.

The quintessential streetfghter as we know it however is arguably grown from the 1990s explosion in sportbike popularity.  Due to the relative fragility of the encompassing plastic body work, and the high cost to replacement should a rider crash their bike, the owners (typically younger with limited resources) would remove the damaged fairings and fit some relatively inexpensive dirt bike signals and be on their way.  Alternately crashed bikes which were otherwise completely serviceable would often be written off by insurance companies, resulting in an explosion in cheap high performance bikes on the market needing only superficial repairs to be street legal once again. Naturally it didn't take long for manufacturers to see that there was actually a market for this growing aesthetic in the era of grunge.  With a few modifications to their existing designs, which were equally cost cutting measures for manufacturers, a whole new category of motorcycle was born.

See also 
 Standard motorcycle
 Outline of motorcycles and motorcycling

References

External links 

 Triumph StreetFighter

Custom motorcycles
Sport bikes
Standard motorcycles
Motorcycle customization